is a Japanese kickboxer fighting out of the Silver Wolf Gym, the same gym of the legendary kickboxer Masato. He was the RISE kickboxing Super Lightweight champion, winning his title against Japanese kickboxer Koji Yoshimoto.

He was K-1 World GP 2014 -65kg Championship Tournament finalist and holds victories over notable featherweight kickboxers such as Minoru Kimura and Yuta Kubo.

Kickboxing career

RISE Super Lightweight title run
Soda made his debut in 2009, when he participated in the RISE 59 RISING ROOKIES CUP. He won the tournament with victories over Ryuji Yamaguchi, Ishitsukasa Koichi and Atsushi Hori.

Soda then went on to win his next eight fights, winning three of them by stoppage. His eleven fight winning streak earned him the chance to challenge Koji Yoshimoto for the RISE Super Lightweight title. He suffered the first professional loss of his career, as Yoshimoto won the fight by unanimous decision.

Soda bounced back with a TKO of Kim Dong-soo and a decision win over Komiya Yukihiro, which gave the chance the fight a rematch with Koji Yoshimoto. Soda won the fight, and title, by majority decision.

K-1 Super Lightweight tournament
In his next fight, Soda fought Lee Sung-hyun and won by majority decision.

After winning his next two fights, Soda participated in the 2014 K-1 Super Lightweight Grand Prix. In the quarterfinals, he scored a second round TKO over Minoru Kimura. In the semifinals, he won a decision against Hiroya. In the finals, he fought Kaew Fairtex, and lost a majority decision.

Krush title fights
Following this loss, Soda went on a 3-3 run, which included a win over Yuta Kubo and a second loss to Kaew Fairtex. In August 2017, during Krush 78, Soda fought Jun Nakazawa for the Krush Super Lightweight title. The fight went into an extra round, after which Nakazawa won a split decision.

Soda participated in the 2018 K-1 Super Lightweight Grand Prix. He defeated Mo Abdurahman by a fourth round KO, but lost to Kaew Fairtex by an extra round decision in the semifinals.

During Krush 104, Soda once again fought for the Krush Super Lightweight title, this time against Hayato Suzuki. The fight went into an extra round, after which Suzuki won a unanimous decision.

Titles and accomplishments

Kickboxing
K-1
 2016 K-1 World GP 2014 -65kg Championship Tournament runner-up
RISE
 2013 RISE 65 kg Champion
 2009 RISE ROOKIES CUP 65 kg champion

Professional boxing record

Kickboxing record

|-style="background:#Fbb;"
| 2019-08-31|| Loss || align=left| Hayato Suzuki|| Krush 104  || Tokyo, Japan ||  Ext.R Decision (Unanimous) || 4 || 3:00
|-
! style=background:white colspan=9 |
|-style="background:#cfc;"
| 2019-03-10|| Win|| align=left|  Masaya Matsuhana||K-1 World GP 2019: K’FESTA 2 || Saitama, Japan ||  Decision (Unanimous) || 3 || 3:00
|- 
|-  style="background:#Fbb;"
| 2018-11-03 || Loss || align=left| Kaew Weerasakreck || K-1 World GP 2018: Super Lightweight Championship Tournament, Semi Finals || Saitama Prefecture, Japan || Ext. R. Decision (Unanimous) || 4 || 3:00
|-  
|-  bgcolor="#CCFFCC"
| 2018-11-03 || Win|| align=left| Mo Abdurahman || K-1 World GP 2018: Super Lightweight Championship Tournament, Quarter Finals || Saitama Prefecture, Japan || KO (Right knee to the body) || 4 || 2:30
|-  bgcolor="#CCFFCC"
| 2018-07-22 || Win||align=left| Meng Guodong || Krush.90|| Tokyo, Japan || KO (Left hook to the body) || 2 || 2:54
|-  bgcolor="#fbb"
| 2018-03-21 || Loss|| align=left| Jun Nakazawa || K-1 World GP 2018: K'FESTA.1 || Saitama, Japan || Decision (Majority) || 3 ||3:00
|-  bgcolor="#CCFFCC"
| 2017-12-09 || Win||align=left| Hiroki Nakamura || Krush.83|| Tokyo, Japan || Decision (Unanimous) || 3 || 3:00
|-  
|-  style="background:#Fbb;"
| 2017-08-06 || Loss ||align=left| Jun Nakazawa || Krush.78|| Tokyo, Japan || Extra Round Decision (Split) || 4 || 3:00
|-
! style=background:white colspan=9 |
|-  bgcolor="#CCFFCC"
| 2017-04-02 || Win||align=left| Daiki Matsushita || Krush.75 || Tokyo, Japan || KO (Right Cross) || 1 || 2:18
|-  bgcolor="#CCFFCC"
| 2016-11-02 || Win||align=left| Fawad Seddiqi || K-1 World GP in Japan Featherweight Championship Tournament  || Tokyo, Japan || Decision (unanimous) || 3 || 3:00
|-  
|-  style="background:#Fbb;"
| 2016-03-04 || Loss ||align=left| Hideaki Yamazaki || K-1 World GP 2016 -65kg Japan Tournament, Quarter Finals || Tokyo, Japan || KO (Uppercut + Left Hook) || 2 || 0:32 
|-  
|-  style="background:#Fbb;"
| 2015-11-21|| Loss|| align=left| Masaaki Noiri || K-1 World GP 2015 The Championship || Tokyo, Japan || Decision (unanimous) || 3 || 3:00 
|-  
|-  style="background:#Fbb;"
| 2015-07-04 || Loss|| align=left| Kaew Fairtex || K-1 World GP 2015 -70kg Championship Tournament || Tokyo, Japan || Decision (unanimous) || 3 || 3:00
|-  bgcolor="#CCFFCC"
| 2015-04-19 || Win||align=left| Yuta Kubo || K-1 World GP 2015 -55kg Championship Tournament || Tokyo, Japan || Decision (unanimous) || 3 || 3:00
|-  
|-  style="background:#Fbb;"
| 2014-11-03|| Loss|| align=left| Kaew Fairtex || K-1 World GP 2014 -65kg Championship Tournament, Final || Shibuya, Tokyo, Japan || Decision (Majority) || 3 || 3:00
|-
! style=background:white colspan=9 |
|-  bgcolor="#CCFFCC"
| 2014-11-03|| Win||align=left| Hiroya ||K-1 World GP 2014 -65kg Championship Tournament, Semi Finals || Shibuya, Tokyo, Japan || Decision (Majority) || 3 || 3:00
|-  bgcolor="#CCFFCC"
| 2014-11-03 || Win|| align=left| Minoru Kimura || K-1 World GP 2014 -65kg Championship Tournament, Quarter Finals || Shibuya, Tokyo, Japan || TKO (2 Knockdowns/body knees) || 2 || 2:43
|-  bgcolor="#CCFFCC"
| 2014-03-30 || Win|| align=left| Tapruwan Hadesworkout || RISE 98 || Tokyo, Japan || Decision (Unanimous) || 3 || 3:00
|-  bgcolor="#CCFFCC"
| 2013-11-04|| Win|| align=left| Kevin Eiberg  ||RISE 96||  Tokyo, Japan ||  Decision (Unanimous) || 3 || 3:00
|-  bgcolor="#CCFFCC"
| 2013-07-19|| Win|| align=left| Lee Sung-hyun  ||RISE 94|| Tokyo, Japan ||  Decision (Majority) || 3 || 3:00
|-  bgcolor="#CCFFCC"
| 2013-03-17|| Win|| align=left| Koji Yoshimoto  ||RISE 92|| Tokyo, Japan ||  Decision (Majority) || 5 || 3:00
|-
! style=background:white colspan=9 |
|-  bgcolor="#CCFFCC"
| 2012-10-25|| Win|| align=left| Yukihiro Komiya||RISE 90|| Tokyo, Japan ||  Decision (Unanimous) || 3 || 3:00
|-  bgcolor="#CCFFCC"
| 2012-06-02|| Win|| align=left|  Kim Dong-soo ||RISE 88||  Tokyo, Japan ||  TKO  || 3 || 2:29
|-  style="background:#Fbb;"
| 2012-01-28|| Loss|| align=left| Koji Yoshimoto  || RISE 86 || Tokyo, Japan || Decision (Unanimous) || 5 || 3:00
|-
! style=background:white colspan=9 |
|-  bgcolor="#CCFFCC"
| 2011-09-23|| Win|| align=left| Kotetsu ||RISE 83 ||  Tokyo, Japan ||  KO || 2 || 1:08
|-  bgcolor="#CCFFCC"
| 2011-06-25|| Win|| align=left| Shingo Yokoyama ||K-1 WORLD MAX 2011 –63 kg Japan Tournament||  Tokyo, Japan ||  Decision (Unanimous) || 3 || 3:00
|-  bgcolor="#CCFFCC"
| 2011-04-17|| Win|| align=left| Tomo Kiire ||RISE 76||  Tokyo, Japan ||  Ext.R Decision (Split) || 4 || 3:00
|-  bgcolor="#CCFFCC"
| 2011-02-27|| Win|| align=left| AKIRA ||RISE 74||  Tokyo, Japan ||  KO (Right Low Kicks) || 3 || 1:11
|-  bgcolor="#CCFFCC"
| 2010-12-19|| Win|| align=left| Kewpie||RISE 73||  Tokyo, Japan ||  Decision (Unanimous) || 3 || 3:00
|-  bgcolor="#CCFFCC"
| 2010-10-03|| Win|| align=left| Snake Atsushi ||RISE 71||  Tokyo, Japan ||  KO (Right Low Kicks) || 2 || 0:49
|-  bgcolor="#CCFFCC"
| 2010-05-16|| Win|| align=left| Kwon Min Seok ||RISE 65 ||  Tokyo, Japan ||  Decision (Majority) || 3 || 3:00
|-  bgcolor="#CCFFCC"
| 2009-11-22|| Win|| align=left| Masanori Gojou ||RISE 60 ||  Tokyo, Japan ||  Decision (Unanimous) || 3 || 3:00
|-  bgcolor="#CCFFCC"
| 2009-10-04|| Win|| align=left| Atsushi Hori ||RISE 59 RISING ROOKIES CUP Final||  Tokyo, Japan ||  Decision (Unanimous) || 3 || 3:00
|-
! style=background:white colspan=9 |
|-  bgcolor="#CCFFCC"
| 2009-08-23|| Win|| align=left| Koichi Ishizuka ||RISE 58 RISING ROOKIES CUP Semi Finals||  Tokyo, Japan || Ext.R Decision (Unanimous) || 4 || 3:00
|-  bgcolor="#CCFFCC"
| 2009-04-26|| Win|| align=left| Ryuji Yamaguchi || R.I.S.E. 54 RISING ROOKIES CUP Quarter Finals||  Tokyo, Japan || KO (Left Hook) || 1 || 0:40
|-
| colspan=9 | Legend:

See also
 List of male kickboxers

References

Living people
1988 births
Japanese male kickboxers
Sportspeople from Tokyo